The Lago Potrero de los Funes circuit is an Argentine motorsports race track originally constructed in 1987, and rebuilt in 2008. It was created by modifying the ring road that encircles Lake Potrero de los Funes, at the course's center.

The circuit has received very high praise from the drivers for its substantial undulations and numerous high speed corners and bends, which provide a great driving challenge.

The track's layout has changed slightly from its original layout. It appears that the curve prior to where the pits are now was tightened to create a more pronounced corner ahead of the pits, and perhaps to reduce speeds on the racing line going past the new pit exit. On the opposite side of the lake, where start/finish used to be located, a chicane has been added at the first high speed bend along that stretch. Also, on the initial descending run along the lake, there has been another chicane added to reduce speeds into the following corner that has limited run-off.

Races hosted
According to Damian Vega's account, a meet was held at this circuit on August 15, 1987. The main event was a Turismo Carretera race. During one of the heat races, a crash occurred that resulted in the deaths of two spectators. In the feature race, there was another crash, but the driver survived, though he may have been injured. This was the circuit's only meeting until the FIA GT weekend was held in November 2008.

On the track's reopening, two major events were hosted in November 2008. A race weekend was shared by the Argentinian TC 2000 as well as the international FIA GT Championship. José María López won the TC 2000 event, while Bert Longin and Anthony Kumpen won the San Luis 2 Hours in their Saleen S7R.

The official race lap records at the Potrero de los Funes Circuit are listed as:

References

External links 
 http://www.fiagt.com/eventdetail.php?season=2008&event=10
 https://web.archive.org/web/20081103035517/http://www.fiagtsanluis.com/circuito.html
 Potrero de los Funes Photographic Tour
 Información turística sobre Potrero de los Funes, San Luís, Argentina.
 Portal de cabañas de Potrero de los Funes

Motorsport venues in San Luis Province
Sport in San Luis Province
Buildings and structures in San Luis Province